Calle 161 is a simple station that is part of the TransMilenio mass-transit system of Bogotá, Colombia.

Location
The station is located in northern Bogotá, specifically on Autopista Norte with Calle 161.

It serves the Cantagallo, Las Orquideas and Estrella del Norte neighborhoods.

History
After the opening of the Portal de Usme in early 2001, the Autopista Norte line was opened. This station was added as a northerly expansion of that line, which was completed with the opening of the Portal del Norte later that year.

The station receives from the street that is on the north side of it.

As of March 2019 changed the name of Cardio Infantil to the current name.

Station Services

Old trunk services

Main line service

Feeder routes
This station does not have connections to feeder routes.

Inter-city service
This station does not have inter-city service.

See also
 List of TransMilenio Stations

References

TransMilenio